Séraphine or Seraphine may refer to:

Seraphine (musical instrument), 19c. keyboard instrument, an early version of the harmonium
Séraphine Louis (Séraphine de Senlis, 1864–1942), French painter
Séraphine (film) (2008), Franco-Belgian film about her
Séraphine, a play by Victorien Sardou
Séraphine (company), an international maternity fashion label and store
Seraphine, a fictional online personality, singer, member of the virtual K-pop group K/DA, and a champion in the video game League of Legends

See also 
 Seraphin (disambiguation) 
 Serafin (disambiguation) 
 Serafina (given name) 
 Serafino (disambiguation) 
 Serapion (disambiguation)

French feminine given names